João Pedro dos Santos Gonçalves (born 15 April 1982 in Beja), known as China, is a Portuguese professional footballer who plays as a left back.

Club statistics

References

External links

1982 births
Living people
People from Beja, Portugal
Portuguese footballers
Association football defenders
Primeira Liga players
Liga Portugal 2 players
Segunda Divisão players
C.D. Beja players
S.C. Pombal players
C.D. Fátima players
F.C. Maia players
Associação Naval 1º de Maio players
C.F. Os Belenenses players
U.D. Vilafranquense players
Ukrainian Premier League players
FC Metalurh Donetsk players
Cypriot First Division players
Ermis Aradippou FC players
Nea Salamis Famagusta FC players
Portuguese expatriate footballers
Expatriate footballers in Ukraine
Expatriate footballers in Cyprus
Portuguese expatriate sportspeople in Ukraine
Portuguese expatriate sportspeople in Cyprus
Sportspeople from Beja District